Sam Dixon (born July 29, 1957) is an American basketball coach.  He is the head women's basketball coach at Nebraska Wesleyan University.  Dixon served as the head women's basketball coach at Furman University from 2002 to 2010.

Dixon was born in Peoria, Illinois and played for Bishop Watterson High School in Columbus, Ohio, and for the College of Wooster, where he received a Bachelor of Arts degree in physical education in 1979 and was inducted into the Wooster College Hall of Fame in 1989.  He also has a master's degree from Eastern Michigan University, and a Ph.D. from University of New Mexico in 1997, both in physical education.

Dixon coached women's basketball as an assistant at Clemson University from 1999 to 2001, and before that at the University of Arizona in 1998–99.  He served as an assistant men's basketball coach at Northern Illinois University, Davidson College, Kent State University, and Northern Kentucky University, as well as Harrison High School in Kennesaw, Georgia.

Head coaching record

Women's basketball

References

External links
 Nebraska Wesleyan profile
 Northwestern profile
 Furman profile

1957 births
Living people
Akron Zips women's basketball coaches
American men's basketball players
American women's basketball coaches
Arizona Wildcats women's basketball coaches
Basketball coaches from Illinois
Basketball players from Illinois
Clemson Tigers women's basketball coaches
College golf coaches in the United States
Davidson Wildcats men's basketball coaches
Denison Big Red men's basketball coaches
Eastern Michigan Eagles men's basketball coaches
Eastern Michigan University alumni
Furman Paladins women's basketball coaches
High school basketball coaches in the United States
Kent State Golden Flashes men's basketball coaches
New Mexico Lobos men's basketball coaches
Northern Illinois Huskies men's basketball coaches
Northern Kentucky Norse men's basketball coaches
Sportspeople from Peoria, Illinois
University of New Mexico alumni
Wooster Fighting Scots men's basketball players